Etelä-Suomen Sanomat (meaning South Finland News in English; nickname Etlari) is a Finnish daily newspaper published in Lahti, Finland. It is the leading paper in its metropolitan area.

History and profile
Etelä-Suomen Sanomat began publishing in 1914. The paper originated from the prior Lahden Lehti (1900–1909) and Lahden Sanomat (1909–1914) newspapers. The paper has a liberal editorial stance.

Heikki Hakala has served as editor-in-chief since 1996.

Circulation
The circulation of Etelä-Suomen Sanomat began to grow during the 1940s. Its circulation was 67,185 copies in 2001. The 2004 circulation of the paper was 62,155 copies. The same year the paper had a readership of 145,000. The paper had a circulation of 60,889 copies. In 2007 the circulation of the paper was 61,003 copies.

In 2009 its circulation was 60,420 copies. Its circulation was 56,616 copies in 2011. The circulation of the paper was 51,537 copies in 2013.

Chief editors
Oskar Marjanen 1914
Kaarlo Kytömaa 1914–1915
Jaakko Tervo 1915–1920
Jalmari Niemi 1920–1927
William Ilmoni 1927–1932
Frans Keränen 1932–1962
Tauno Lahtinen 1962–1983
Olli Järvinen 1962–1973
Eeva Rissanen 1972–1986
Kauko Mäenpää 1984–1999
Pentti Vuorio 1986–1995
Heikki Hakala 1997–2014
Perttu Kauppinen 2015–2018
Markus Pirttijoki 2019–

References

External links
 Official site

1914 establishments in Finland
Publications established in 1914
Daily newspapers published in Finland
Finnish-language newspapers
Mass media in Lahti